The Albatros C.X was a German military reconnaissance aircraft that saw service during World War I.

Design and development
The C.X was essentially an enlarged development of the Albatros C.VII designed to take advantage of the new Mercedes D.IVa engine that became available in 1917. Unlike the C.VII that preceded it in service, the C.X utilised the top wing spar-mounted radiator that had first been tried on the C.V/17. Other important modernisation features included provision for oxygen for the crew and radio equipment.

Operators

Luftstreitkräfte

Specifications (C.X)

References

 

 

Biplanes
Single-engined tractor aircraft
1910s German military reconnaissance aircraft
C.10
Aircraft first flown in 1917